George Kekewich may refer to:
 George Kekewich (Saltash MP) (1530–1582), Member of Parliament (MP) for Saltash in the First Parliament of 1553
 George Kekewich (Roundhead), Member of Parliament for Liskeard, 1640 and 1647–1648
 Sir George William Kekewich (1841–1921), MP for Exeter, 1906–1910

See also
Kekewich